Leslie Clive Griffin (1907 – 1985) was an Australian rugby league footballer who played in the 1920s and 1930s.

Playing career
Originally from Tumut, New South Wales, Griffin played for New South Wales in 1930 and 1931 before moving to St. George.

He played first grade  for only the 1935 NSWRFL season, but in doing so created a club and NSWRFL point scoring record. In a match against Canterbury-Bankstown on 11 May 1935 at Earl Park, Arncliffe, Griffin scored 36 points (2 tries and  15 goals) in the St. George club's biggest ever win (91-6)  which is still a club record for an individual player, while his 15 goals is still an NSWRFL record (held jointly with Easts legend Dave Brown.

As of the 2019 NRL season, this remains the biggest recorded victory by a team and the biggest winning margin.

References

1907 births
Australian rugby league players
New South Wales rugby league team players
Country New South Wales rugby league team players
Rugby league centres
Rugby league wingers
St. George Dragons players
1985 deaths